Mohamed Mkacher (born 25 May 1975) is a Tunisian football coach and a former defender who 
also was nominated for the Tunisian national team at the 2002 FIFA World Cup.

References

External links

Mohamed Mkacher at Footballdatabase

1975 births
Living people
Tunisian footballers
Olympic footballers of Tunisia
Footballers at the 1996 Summer Olympics
Tunisia international footballers
1998 African Cup of Nations players
2002 FIFA World Cup players
Étoile Sportive du Sahel players
Club Africain players
JS Kairouan players
Tunisian Ligue Professionnelle 1 players
Association football defenders
Tunisian football managers
Étoile Sportive du Sahel managers
Sfax Railways Sports managers
Stade Tunisien managers
Al-Ain FC (Saudi Arabia) managers
Saudi First Division League managers
Tunisian expatriate football managers
Expatriate football managers in Bahrain
Tunisian expatriate sportspeople in Bahrain
Expatriate football managers in Saudi Arabia
Tunisian expatriate sportspeople in Saudi Arabia